Maya is a Bengali album by various musical groups and artists with collaboration and produced by the rock band Moheener Ghoraguli. It was released in 1997 by Asha Audio in India.

Track listing

References

External links

1997 albums
Moheener Ghoraguli albums
Asha Audio albums